Eduardo Atanasio Pérez Pérez (born September 11, 1969) is an American former professional baseball player, coach, and current television sports color commentator. After his playing career Pérez became a baseball analyst with ESPN, ESPN Deportes, and ESPN Latin America as well as a host on SiriusXM's MLB Network Radio.

Early career
Eduardo Pérez was born in Cincinnati, the younger son of baseball Hall of Famer Tony Pérez and Pituka Pérez. His godfather is Hall of Famer Orlando Cepeda. Pérez's brother, Victor, graduated from Xavier University and played one year in the Cincinnati Reds minor league system.

Pérez graduated from Robinson School, a private, college-prep high school in San Juan, Puerto Rico. He went to Florida State University and majored in political science. He played college baseball under head coach Mike Martin for the Florida State Seminoles baseball team. In 1989, he played collegiate summer baseball with the Brewster Whitecaps of the Cape Cod Baseball League. As a Seminoles' junior in 1991, Pérez was named 2nd Team All-American by the American Baseball Coaches Association and 3rd Team All-American by Baseball America, batting .370 with 11 home runs, 58 RBIs, and 30 stolen bases. That year, the Seminoles were also in the College World Series, and Pérez was a first-round draft pick (17th overall) of the California Angels.

Pérez played professionally in 1991 for the Angels' Class A short-season Boise Hawks of the Northwest League. The following year, he played for the Class A Palm Springs Angels of the California League before being promoted to the Class AA Midland Angels of the Texas League. In 1993 he played most of the year with the Class AAA Vancouver Canadians of the Pacific Coast League, and in July he was called up to the parent club.

Major league career
Pérez played his first major league game on July 27, 1993, as the host Angels defeated the Oakland A's 15–8. Starting at third base and batting sixth, he had three at-bats, two hits, a walk, three runs batted in and three runs scored. His first at-bat resulted in a first-inning walk against Bobby Witt.

Perez recalled that first at-bat as an announcer on the May 6. 2019, ESPN Monday Night Baseball broadcast.  Perez had swung at a slider that was over a foot and a half off the plate to honor a childhood pact with his brother that if either of them made it to the major leagues they agreed to swing at the first pitch.

An inning later he got his first career hit, a double off reliever Joe Boever. In the eighth inning, Pérez hit his first home run, a 3-run shot off Kevin Campbell, scoring teammates Tim Salmon and Chili Davis.

He also hit the first of his three career walk-off home runs in 1993. The Angels trailed the Minnesota Twins 3–2 in the bottom of the ninth inning with Salmon on base and one out. Pérez homered to left field off Twins reliever Rick Aguilera for a 4-3 Angels win.

Pérez's most productive year came in 1997 for the Cincinnati Reds. In 330 plate appearances, he hit .253 with 16 home runs, 52 runs batted in, 18 doubles, 29 walks and five stolen bases. In 2003 for the St. Louis Cardinals, in 289 plate appearances, he hit .285 with 11 home runs, 41 runs batted in, 16 doubles, 29 walks and five stolen bases.

One pitcher that Pérez had the most success against was one of the all-time dominant hurlers, Hall-of-Famer Randy Johnson. On April 19, 2005, starting at first base for Tampa Bay against the New York Yankees in Yankee Stadium, Pérez hit two home runs (in consecutive at-bats) and knocked in three runs against Johnson. through that game. Perez was 8-for-27 lifetime against Johnson, with four home runs, seven runs batted in and two doubles. In 2006, Pérez's last season, Johnson was ejected and suspended five games for a brushback pitch against Pérez a half-inning after Johnson's teammate, Jorge Posada, had been hit by a pitch.

Pérez's four home runs against Johnson were the most against one pitcher in Pérez's career. He hit three each off Al Leiter and Sterling Hitchcock.

Pérez also was known for some big pinch-hit home runs during his career, including three in one season (2002) for the Cardinals and seven for his career. His game-winning pinch-hit home runs included an 11th-inning shot for the Reds off Los Angeles Dodgers pitcher Mark Guthrie in 1997, an eighth-inning two-run shot for the Cardinals off New York Mets pitcher Al Leiter in 2002, and a ninth-inning walk-off solo shot for the Devil Rays against pitcher Alan Embree.

Perez's final career hit came September 23, 2006 as the Mariners fell to the host Chicago White Sox, 11–7. He hit a fifth-inning single off Mark Buehrle, driving in Raúl Ibañez. His final career at-bat was September 29, 2006. At age 37, playing for the Seattle Mariners in a 6–5 loss to the Texas Rangers, he pinch hit for Ben Broussard and struck out against C. J. Wilson.

Later career
Pérez joined ESPN's Baseball Tonight 2006 postseason coverage along with then-current player Vernon Wells, and former players Tino Martinez and Eric Byrnes. Pérez worked as an analyst for "Baseball Tonight" through 2011 and also served as an analyst for ESPN Deportes' "Béisbol Esta Noche." In 2007, he provided commentary for the NCAA baseball regionals, the Triple-A All-Star Game and the Little League World Series regionals. He speaks both English and Spanish fluently.

In late 2007, three months after the Puerto Rican winter baseball league was cancelled after 69 seasons, Pérez returned to Puerto Rico and announced his founding of the Winter Training Program (WTP) for both professional and amateur players in an effort to return pro baseball back to the island. The program was sponsored by the government municipality of San Juan, Major League Baseball, and private donors.

In 2008 and 2009, Pérez was manager of Leones de Ponce in Puerto Rico. He was named 2008 Manager of the Year in the Puerto Rico Baseball League, leading the team to the league title.

While serving as a special assistant to the baseball operations department of the Cleveland Indians, on June 8, 2011, Pérez was named hitting coach of the Miami Marlins, replacing John Mallee, a position he held until manager Ozzie Guillén and most of his staff were let go shortly after the 2012 season. He managed the team representing Colombia in the World Baseball Classic Qualifying Round in 2013, finishing with a 1–2 record.

He served as the Houston Astros bench coach under manager Bo Porter during the 2013 season. For 2014, he was named the Astros first base coach, but he resigned that position in early January 2014 to spend more time with family.

On February 11, 2014, ESPN announced that Pérez had rejoined the network as a studio and game analyst.

During the winter of 2014–2015, Pérez served as the manager of the Santurce Crabbers in the Puerto Rican Winter League. The Crabbers won the league championship and participated in the Caribbean World Series.
 
In 2016, Pérez joined SiriusXM's MLB Network Radio hosting The Leadoff Spot with Steve Phillips Wednesdays, Thursdays & Fridays.

In 2020, while MLB was shut down due to the COVID-19 pandemic, Pérez worked on ESPN's coverage of baseball from the Korea Baseball Organization, working with Karl Ravech.

On September 29, 2020, Pérez alongside Karl Ravech and Tim Kurkjian called Game 1 of the American League wild card playoff series between the Houston Astros and Minnesota Twins. It was the first time that the ABC network broadcast a Major League Baseball game since Game 5 of the 1995 World Series.

Family
Pérez is married to Mirba Rivera; they wed in December 2000. The couple has one daughter-Andreanna, born in 2003. The family's main residence is in San Juan, Puerto Rico. The family now lives in Miami, Florida.

See also
 List of second-generation Major League Baseball players
 List of Cuban Americans

References

External links

1969 births
Living people
American expatriate baseball players in Canada
American expatriate baseball players in Japan
American sportspeople of Cuban descent
Baseball coaches from Ohio
Baseball players from Cincinnati
Boise Hawks players
Brewster Whitecaps players
California Angels players
Caribbean Series managers
Cincinnati Reds players
Cleveland Indians players
ESPN people
Florida Marlins coaches
Florida State Seminoles baseball players
Hanshin Tigers players
Houston Astros coaches
Indianapolis Indians players
Major League Baseball bench coaches
Major League Baseball broadcasters
Major League Baseball first basemen
Major League Baseball hitting coaches
Major League Baseball third basemen
Major League Baseball outfielders
Memphis Redbirds players
Midland Angels players
Palm Springs Angels players
Seattle Mariners players
St. Louis Cardinals players
Tampa Bay Devil Rays players
Vancouver Canadians players
2006 World Baseball Classic players